This is a list of the titles and honours held by Prince Arthur, Duke of Connaught and Strathearn, a senior officer of the British Army, Governor General of Canada, and member of the British royal family as third son of Queen Victoria.

Name
On 22 June 1850 Prince Arthur was baptised in the Chapel at Buckingham Palace with the Christian names Arthur William Patrick Albert. As a member of the Royal Family, he had no surname until 17 July 1917, when a Royal Proclamation of King George V declared that all British descendants in the male line of Queen Victoria would bear the name of Windsor.

Titles, styles and honours

Titles and styles
 1 May 1850 – 24 May 1874: His Royal Highness The Prince Arthur
 24 May 1874 – 16 January 1942: His Royal Highness The Duke of Connaught and Strathearn

As a son of the sovereign, Arthur had the title of Prince and the style of Royal Highness from birth. The princely title had been used for sons of the sovereign since Tudor times and was formalised by letters patent of 30 November 1917, while the style of Royal Highness had been used since the Restoration and was confirmed by letters patent of 3 February 1864. Through his father, Prince Albert, he also bore the titles Prince of Saxe-Coburg and Gotha and Duke of Saxony until 17 July 1917, when King George V discontinued the use of German titles.

On 24 May 1874, Prince Arthur was created Duke of Connaught and Strathearn and Earl of Sussex, in the Peerage of the United Kingdom. As a duke of the Blood Royal, he had the formal style of Most High, Most Mighty, and Illustrious Prince Arthur William Patrick Albert, Duke of Connaught and Strathearn and Earl of Sussex.

Orders, decorations and medals
(ribbon bar, as it would look today; British decorations only)

British
  KG: Royal Knight of the Garter, 31 May 1867
  KT: Extra Knight of the Thistle, 24 May 1869
  KP: Knight of St. Patrick, 30 March 1869
  GCMG: Knight Grand Cross of St Michael and St George, 16 April 1870
  GCSI: Extra Knight Grand Commander of the Star of India, 1 January 1877
  CB: Companion of the Bath (military), 17 November 18827 July 1890
 KCB: Knight Commander of the Bath (military), 8 July 189020 May 1898
 GCB: Knight Grand Cross of the Bath (military), 21 May 189825 February 1901
 Great Master of the Order of the Bath, 26 February 19011942
  GCIE: Extra Knight Grand Commander of the Indian Empire, 21 June 1887
  GCVO: Knight Grand Cross of the Royal Victorian Order, 6 May 1896
  KStJ: Knight of Justice of St John, 189611 June 1926
 GCStJ: Bailiff Grand Cross of St John, 12 June 1926
 Grand Prior of the Order of St John, 23 June 19101939
  Royal Victorian Chain, 11 August 1902
  GBE: Knight Grand Cross of the British Empire, 4 June 1917

The Duke was Bailiff of Egle from 1894

Campaign medals
  Canadian General Service Medal with clasp for Fenian Raid 1870
  Egypt Medal with clasp for Battle of Tel el-Kebir 1882
  British War Medal, 26 July 1919
  Victory Medal, 1 September 1919

Long service medals
  Volunteer Officers' Decoration (VD), 27 May 1892
  Territorial Decoration (TD), 19 June 1934

Foreign

Military

Ranks

 1866: Cadet, RMA Woolwich
 19 June 1868: Lieutenant, Royal Engineers
 2 November 1868: Lieutenant, Royal Regiment of Artillery
 3 August 1869: Lieutenant, Rifle Brigade
 1 May 1871: Captain, Rifle Brigade
 14 April 1874: Captain, 7th Hussars
 7 August 1875: Major, 7th Hussars
 27 September 1876: Lieutenant-Colonel, Rifle Brigade
 29 May 1880: Brevet Colonel, British Army
 29 May 1880: Major-General, British Army
 14 December 1886: Lieutenant-General, British Army (local rank while commanding the troops in Bombay)
 1 April 1889: Lieutenant-General, British Army (supernumerary)
 1 April 1893: General, British Army (supernumerary)
 26 June 1902: Field Marshal, British Army
 18 October 1920: Honorary Captain, Royal Naval Reserve

Honorary appointments

Personal Aide-de-Camp
 26 May 1876: to Queen Victoria
 1901: to King Edward VII
 3 June 1910: to King George V
 1936: to Edward VIII

Colonel of the Regiment

 24 June 1883: Scots Guards (until 1 May 1904)
 2 September 1902: Army Service Corps 
 1 May 1904: Grenadier Guards
 13 October 1911 – 11 November 1916: Colonel of the Governor General's Horse Guards
 13 October 1911 – 11 November 1916: Colonel of the Governor General's Foot Guards
 13 October 1911 – 11 November 1916: Colonel of the Canadian Grenadier Guards

Honorary Colonel
 30 June 1871: 28th Middlesex Rifle Volunteer Corps
 26 April 1873: Royal East Kent Yeomanry (until 16 January 1878)
 24 July 1875: Hampshire and Isle of Wight Artillery
 1 September 1883: 7th Bengal Native Infantry (until 13 May 1904)
 1 September 1883: 29th Bombay Native Infantry (2nd Biluch Regiment) (until 13 May 1904)
 27 February 1886: Royal East Kent Yeomanry
 12 February 1896: 3rd and 4th Battalions, Highland Light Infantry
 1 May 1900: The British Columbia Regiment (Duke of Connaught's Own)
 19 March 1904: South of Ireland Imperial Yeomanry
 6th Regiment, Duke of Connaught's Own Rifles

Colonel-in-Chief
 29 May 1880: Rifle Brigade
 22 June 1897: 6th Dragoons
 4 September 1901: Highland Light Infantry
 13 May 1904: 13th Duke of Connaught's Lancers (Watson's Horse)
 13 May 1904: 31st Duke of Connaught's Own Lancers
 13 May 1904: 7th (Duke of Connaught's Own) Rajputs
 13 May 1904: 129th Duke of Connaught's Own Baluchis
 1929: The Royal Canadian Regiment

Foreign military appointments
 1890s: Colonel à la suite 27th (Kiev) Regiment of Dragoons, Russian Army
 June 1905: Honorary General, Swedish Army
 12 September 1906: Field Marshal, Prussian Army
 21 May 1908: Honorary Lieutenant-Colonel, 9th (Arapiles) Battalion of Light Infantry, Spanish Army
 24 May 1910: Honorary Admiral, Royal Danish Navy

Civil

Privy Counsellor
 Member of the Privy Council of the United Kingdom, 16 May 1871
 Member of the Privy Council of Ireland, 10 January 1900

Others
 Ranger of Epping Forest, 1879
 Bencher of Gray's Inn, 4 July 1881
 Elder Brother of the Corporation of Trinity House, 1898; Master, 1910–1942
 High Steward of Wokingham

Freedom of the City
The Duke of Connaught and Strathearn received the Freedom of several locations during his life. These Include

  1921: Portsmouth.

References

Arthur